Bena is a genus of moths in the family Nolidae. The genus was erected by Gustaf Johan Billberg in 1820.

Species
Bena bicolorana (Fuessly, 1775) Europe, Turkey
Bena africana (Warren, 1913) Tunisia

References

Chloephorinae